Antonie Ruset or Antonie Rosetti (c. 1615 – 1685) ruled from November 10, 1675 to November 1678 in the Principality of Moldova.

Life 
He came from an ancient family of Greek origin. Ruset ordered on March 29, 1677, the relocation of the seat of the Moldovan Metropolitan of the Romanian Orthodox Church from the former princely seat in Suceava in the current capital Iaşi, since according to Byzantine custom both the administrative and the ecclesiastical center of the empire in the same city had to be.

Sources 
 Dimitrie Xenopol: Istoria romanilor din Dacia Traiana, Iași 1891, Bd. IV, S. 327 f

Rulers of Moldavia
1610s births
1685 deaths